Vikasa Vidya Vanam is a school located in Poranki, a suburb of Vijayawada, Andhra Pradesh , India. It was established in 1983 in Vijayawada with the principle of child-centered education by a group of academic intellectuals forming Vikasa educational trust. It later moved to the current location in Poranki, and attained ICSE-Board affiliation in 2000. The school has student strength around 375, predominantly coming from the region of Vijayawada and its suburbs.

Philosophy 

After the deterioration of public school system from inadequate funding, the school system in Andhra Pradesh at present is dominated by the private schools. The common characters of these schools are, English being the medium of instruction, emphasis only on academic excellence, and often allowing corporal punishment to discipline the children.

The philosophy of Vikasa vidya vanam is inspired from people like Jiddu Krishnamurti and Gijubhai Badheka and says that a school is the place for wholesome development of the child and it is best achieved in a pressure-free environment. Medium of education at the primary level (Up to grade V) is the children's mother tongue (Telugu). The children are introduced early to English as a language, transitioning later in to the medium of instruction. Punishment in any form is non-existent here.

Grades VI to XII are conducted in a fully residential campus under the name Living Vikasa Vidya Vanam in Akkineni Sudarshana Puram, Agiripalli, about 22 km from the city of Vijayawada.

Campuses

Primary day school at Poranki 
Vikasa Vidya Vanam Day School for children of ages 3 to 11 years (Kindergarten to 6th class) has been striving to provide a child-centered learning environment in current location at Poranki, Vijayawada. Salient features of the Primary School Program are:
 Medium of Instruction - Telugu
 No homework

Residential school at Adavinekkalam 
The Living Vikasa Vidya Vanam is a residential school for children of ages 11 to 16 years (classes 6th to 10th) at Akkineni Sudarsana Puram, about 24km away from Vijayawada. 

It provides an environment of community living for the holistic development of the young adolescent.

Vikasa Vidya Vanam is affiliated to The Council for the Indian School Certificate Examinations (CISCE), New Delhi for the certifications after Class X (ICSE) and Class XII (ISC).

Vikasa Educational Trust 
Vikasa Educational Trust is a non-profit organization established in December 1982 under the Societies Registration Act XXI of 1860. The founding governing body consisted of seven educators sharing similar concerns about the abuses endured by children because of unhealthy educational practices. The members of the first Governing body were Anne Radhakrishnamurti (president), T.Venugopalarao (vice-president), S.R.Parimi (secretary), Y.Venkateswararao, B.V.Apparao, Y. Ramakrishnayya and E.Venkateswararao

Over the last 27 years, many enthusiastic college graduates joined the Trust as members and contributed towards furthering the Trust's objectives. The present strength of the General Body is 23. The General Body, as per the bylaws, elects the new Governing Body every three years. The present Governing Body members are D. Sambasivarao (President), A. Jagannatha Rao (vice-president), S.R. Parimi (secretary), Dr. K. Jayapradadevi (treasurer), R. Santhi, Hema Parimi, and G. Jayshree.

Activities of the Trust include:
 Vikasa Vidya Vanam Day School
 Living Vikasa Vidya Vanam
 Providing scholarships to children belonging to low income groups
 Organizing annual seminars on topics related to school education
 Organizing awareness programs for parents on holistic development of children
 Organizing workshops/seminars for teachers on 'Child-Centered Education'
 Organized awareness programs for teachers and parents in collaboration with organizations like -Forum for child centered education, Loksatta, Jana Vignana Vedika

See also 
 Montessori method
 List of schools in India
 Rishi valley school, located in Chittoor and based on the same philosophy.
 Walden's Path, Hyderabad

References

External links
Vikasa Vidya Vanam Official Website

Education in Vijayawada
Schools in Krishna district
Schools in Andhra Pradesh
1983 establishments in Andhra Pradesh
Educational institutions established in 1983